The 2021–22 Marshall Thundering Herd men's basketball team represented Marshall University during the 2021–22 NCAA Division I men's basketball season. The Thundering Herd, led by eighth-year head coach Dan D'Antoni, played their home games at the Cam Henderson Center as members of Conference USA. They finished the season 12–21, 4–14 in C-USA play to finish in seventh place in the East Division. They defeated FIU before losing to Louisiana Tech in the second round of the C-USA tournament.

On October 30, 2021, Marshall announced they would become a member of the Sun Belt Conference. On March 29, it was announced they would officially join on July 1, 2022, making this the final season competing in C-USA.

Previous season
The Thundering Herd finished the 2020–21 season 15–7, 9–5 in C-USA play to finish in third place in the East Division. They were defeated in the second round of the C-USA tournament by Rice.

Offseason

Departures

2021 recruiting class

Roster
Note: Players' year is based on remaining eligibility. Because the NCAA did not count the 2020–21 season towards eligibility, last year's Freshmen are still considered Freshmen this season.

Schedule and results

|-
!colspan=12 style=| Exhibition

|-
!colspan=12 style=| Non-Conference Regular season

|-
!colspan=9 style=| Conference USA regular season

|-
!colspan=9 style=| Conference USA tournament

References

Marshall Thundering Herd men's basketball seasons
Marshall
Marsh
Marsh